Krukenberg is a German surname. Notable people with the surname include:

Friedrich Ernst Krukenberg (1871–1946), German physician
Gustav Krukenberg (1888–1980), German SS officer
Hermann Krukenberg (1863–1935), German surgeon
Peter Krukenberg (1787–1865), German pathologist

See also
Krukenberg procedure, a surgical technique
Krukenberg tumor, a type of cancerous tumor

German-language surnames